is a leftist group in Japan. It was formed around 1980 and was involved with struggles related to Narita Airport.

There was long-running conflict between the government of Japan and an alliance of leftist activists who were opposed to the airport for ideological reasons with local farmers who did not wish their land to be appropriated.

History
In June 1999, Kakurōkyō split into two factions.

Members of the group are suspected of firing rockets at Narita airport on February 2, 1998. In February 2000 a member of the group was stabbed to death at JR Manazuru Station in Kanagawa prefecture. The three suspects were believed to also be members of the group.

Another member was murdered in front of JR Uguisudani Station in Tokyo on August 31, 2000, making a total of five activists murdered. The deaths continued until 2002, with eight members eventually being murdered.

In 2003 and 2004 around the time of the US invasion of Iraq the group claimed responsibility for mortar attacks on Yokota Air Base, the Defense Agency in Tokyo and Naval Air Facility Atsugi in Kanagawa prefecture. Raids were made in response to the mortar attacks in 2010.

In 2013 the group was believed to have been responsible for another attack on Yokota Air Base.

In September 2015 three men were arrested for assaulting riot police during a protest against security legislation in front of the National Diet building in Tokyo. One of them was reported to be a Kakurōkyō member.

In 2019, the arrest of Toyotona Numata was made, who was the suspect involved in conducting mortar attacks on Camp Zama and Yokota Air Base.

References

External links
 Official Japanese site

1980 establishments in Japan
Communism in Japan
Far-left politics in Japan
Left-wing militant groups in Japan
Organizations established in 1980
Terrorism in Japan